Jake Richard Doran (born 2 December 1996) is an Australian cricketer who plays for Tasmania, Hobart Hurricanes and Australia under-19s. He previously played for New South Wales, and is also the youngest player to be signed to a Big Bash League contract. Doran is the younger brother of cricketer Luke Doran and attended The Hills Sports High School.

Domestic career
In 2013, Doran almost became the youngest player to score a First Grade century; playing for Fairfield-Liverpool against Sydney University, he was on 87* when his team declared. Aged 16, Doran became the youngest player ever to play for New South Wales second XI. For the 2014/15 season, New South Wales signed Doran on a rookie contract, and in October 2014, Doran signed for Big Bash team Sydney Thunder, making him the youngest player to sign a Big Bash contract. Doran signed a one-year contract with the Thunder, a week before finishing his HSC exams. Three other teams, including the Melbourne Stars were believed to have been interested in signing Doran; the Stars would have offered him a senior deal. In January 2015, Doran made his BBL debut for Thunder in a Sydney Derby match against Sydney Sixers; Doran did not bat in the match.

In March 2015, Doran signed for Tasmania from New South Wales on a two-year contract. He made his first-class debut in a Sheffield Shield match against Western Australia, making scores of 5 and 17. In his first five Sheffield Shield matches, he averaged 19.70, with 2 half-centuries. In September 2015, Doran was added to the Tasmania squad for the Matador Cup, and he made his List A debut a month later against Queensland, but did not bat in the match.

In November 2017, he scored his maiden first-class century, batting for Tasmania against South Australia in the 2017–18 Sheffield Shield season. In March 2018, Cricket Australia named Doran in their Sheffield Shield team of the year.

International career
In November 2013, Doran played for Cricket Australia Chairman's XI against an England XI; the match was a tour match prior to the 2013-14 Ashes series, and Doran scored 17 in his only innings. He has also played for Prime Minister's XI against English and Indian teams. He has represented Australia under-19s, and averaged 83 at the 2014 Under-19 Cricket World Cup.  Doran captained the under-19 team in series against England under-19 in 2014/15 and 2015, and scored 103 in the 2015 U-19 Test match between the teams at Chester-le-Street. Former Australian cricketer Stuart MacGill suggested that Doran should have been picked for the fifth and final Test of the 2015 Ashes series.

References

External links
Sydney Thunder profile

Living people
Australian cricketers
1996 births
Cricketers from New South Wales
Sydney Thunder cricketers
Tasmania cricketers
Hobart Hurricanes cricketers
Wicket-keepers